= NRK 5.1 =

Norwegian radio station

Coordinates: 59°56′07″N 10°43′07″E

Station's logo

NRK 5.1 was the world's first radio station to operate using 5.1 surround sound. It was opened on 12 October 2006 by NRK and closed in 2010.

== History ==
NRK 5.1 opened at 2pm on 12 October 2006. It was not available on the DAB platform at launch, but it hoped to launch there at a later date. Programming consisted largely of music and other formats, but was open to include radio dramas and documentaries. NRK compared the experience to being "closer to a concert hall". It was included as part of the finalised 16-channel digital radio package in 2007, but exclusively online.

A decision was made in 2009 to close the station in the following year.
